Deportivo Municipal de Huamanga is a Peruvian football club, playing in the city of Huamanga, Ayacucho, Peru.

Honours

Regional
Región VI: 0
Runner-up (1): 2009

Liga Departamental de Ayacucho: 2
Winners (2): 2005, 2009

Liga Superior de Ayacucho: 1
Winners (1): 2009

See also
List of football clubs in Peru
Peruvian football league system

References 

Football clubs in Peru
Association football clubs established in 1995